The Very Best of Kenny G is the third greatest hits album by saxophonist Kenny G. It was released by Arista Records in 1994.

Track listing 

"Forever in Love" - 4:57
"Waiting for You" - 4:59
"By the Time This Night Is Over" - 4:46
"Jasmine Flower" - 4:36
"Theme from Dying Young" - 4:00
"Uncle Al" - 4:35
"Going Home" - 5:28
"Silhouette" - 4:30
"Against Doctor's Orders" - 4:06
"We've Saved the Best for Last" - 4:19
"Sade" - 4:18
"Midnight Motion" - 4:07
"Don't Make Me Wait for Love" - 4:45
"Songbird" - 3:59

References

External links

1994 greatest hits albums
Kenny G compilation albums
Arista Records compilation albums